L55 or variation, may refer to:

 Aer Lualdi L.55, a helicopter
 Daihatsu L55, a kei-car
 Junkers L55, a V-12 engine
 Rheinmetall Rh-120, L55 subtype; a 120mm gun
 5.2 cm SK L/55 naval gun, a naval gun
 Scania-Vabis L55, a truck
 L55 train set (bullet train), an E3 Series Shinkansen
 , an L-class submarine of the British Royal Navy
 , a W-class destroyer of the British Royal Navy

See also

 L5 (disambiguation)
 LLV (disambiguation)
 I55 
 155 
 55 (disambiguation)